Alcorconazo is the name given by fans and by the Spanish sports press to the first leg of a 2009–10 Copa del Rey two-legged matchup between AD Alcorcón and Real Madrid in the round of 32, a 4–0 win by Alcorcón. The first leg received this name because of the defeat of Real Madrid, one of the largest clubs in Spanish football and in the world, by a modest Alcorcón team which then played in the third-tier Segunda División B. Because Real Madrid won the second leg only 1–0, Alcorcón advanced victorious to the next round.

This defeat was a lead sports story throughout Europe, being the title page in British, French and Italian publications. It also marked a rise to relative prominence for the suburban Madrid club; in what may or may not have been a coincidence, Alcorcón began a major stadium renovation project the following month.

The half-time substitution of Guti when the score was 3–0 and when he was booked before was another topic in the Spanish press because of words exchanged between the player and his coach, Manuel Pellegrini.

It generated superstition and the number of the 4–0 day, 27 October 2009, (27,109) was one of the best-selling lottery tickets on Christmas 2009.

Both matches were broadcast to the entire country on Canal+.

Contrast between Real Madrid and Alcorcón 
The two competing sides had significantly differing financial support. The annual salaries of Alcorcón's matchday squad added up to less than €1 million, compared to the €110 million salary of Real Madrid's squad. Real Madrid had spent €254 million on new signings the previous summer, out of a €420 million annual budget at the time. On the day before the first leg of the cup-tie versus Alcorcón, one of Real Madrid's corporate sponsors gave the entire senior squad new cars worth a total of €2 million. The average annual salary of an Alcorcón player at the time, €36,000, was less than Cristiano Ronaldo made in a day that season. At the time of the match, Real Madrid's youth side played in Segunda B alongside Alcorcón – and had lost only once in seven previous meetings between the two. However, Ronaldo was not included in the squad for the match, along with several other stars who were rested.

Match reports

Round of 32 

|}

First leg

See also
2009–10 Real Madrid CF season

References

External links
 Report on RFEF website

2009–10 Copa del Rey
Copa del Rey matches
Real Madrid CF matches
AD Alcorcón matches
October 2009 sports events in Europe
2009 in Madrid
Football in Madrid
Nicknamed sporting events